Liesbeth Brandt Corstius (8 November 1940 – 12 August 2022) was a Dutch art historian, feminist and museum director.

Brandt Corstius became director of the Museum Arnhem. From the year of her appointment she changed the policy of reserving at least half of the purchases and presentations for female artists. From 1996 she was involved in the expansion of the museum that was opened in 2000.

Brandt Corstius died in Arnhem on 12 August 2022, aged 81.

References

1940 births
2022 deaths
Dutch art historians
Women art historians
20th-century Dutch historians
21st-century Dutch historians
Directors of museums in the Netherlands
Women museum directors
People from Utrecht (city)